A Night in Tunisia is a 1957 jazz album by Art Blakey & the Jazz Messengers, released by the RCA Victor subsidiary label Vik. It features the only recorded instances of saxophonists Jackie McLean and Johnny Griffin playing together.

The album's original five tracks were augmented by up to three alternative takes on CD reissues. The album was also reissued under the title Theory of Art, with two nonet tracks – "A Night at Tony's" and "Social Call" – added.

Track listing

A Night in Tunisia CD
 "A Night in Tunisia" (Dizzy Gillespie, Frank Paparelli) – 12:55
 "Off the Wall" (Johnny Griffin) – 7:16
 "Theory of Art" (Bill Hardman) – 9:46
 "Couldn't It Be You?" (Art Blakey, Jackie McLean) – 8:12
 "Evans" (Sonny Rollins) – 6:30
 "A Night in Tunisia" (Gillespie, Paparelli) – 12:30 Bonus track on CD re-issue.
 "Off the Wall" (Griffin) – 7:21 Bonus track on CD re-issue.
 "Theory of Art" (Hardman) – 10:14 Bonus track on CD re-issue.

Theory of Art CD
First five tracks as A Night in Tunisia, above.

"A Night at Tony's" (Gigi Gryce)
"Social Call" (Gryce, Jon Hendricks)

Personnel

A Night in Tunisia
 Art Blakey – drums
 Bill Hardman – trumpet
 Johnny Griffin – tenor sax
 Jackie McLean (listed as Ferris Benda/Ferris Bender on the cover) – alto sax
 Sam Dockery – piano
 Spanky DeBrest – bass

Theory of Art
 Art Blakey – drums
 Bill Hardman – trumpet
 Lee Morgan – trumpet
 Melba Liston – trombone
 Cecil Payne – baritone sax
 Johnny Griffin – tenor sax
 Sahib Shihab – alto sax
 Wynton Kelly – piano
 Spanky DeBrest – bass

Sources:

References 

Art Blakey albums
The Jazz Messengers albums
Bluebird Records albums
1958 albums
Hard bop albums
RCA Records albums